Testosterone stearate, also known as testosterone octadecanoate, testosterone 17β-stearate, and androst-4-en-17β-ol-3-one 17β-stearate, is an injected anabolic-androgenic steroid (AAS) and an androgen ester – specifically, the C17β stearate (octadecanoate) ester of testosterone – which was never marketed. It is a prodrug of testosterone and, when administered via intramuscular injection, is associated with a long-lasting depot effect and extended duration of action. Testosterone stearate may occur naturally in the body.

It has been said that with longer-chain esters of testosterone like testosterone stearate, the duration of action may be so protracted that the magnitude of effect with typical doses may be too low to be appreciable.

See also
 Testosterone isobutyrate
 Testosterone palmitate
 Testosterone propionate
 Testosterone undecanoate

References

Abandoned drugs
Androgens and anabolic steroids
Androstanes
Ketones
Prodrugs
Stearate esters
Testosterone esters